Paul Ulibarri (born September 7, 1988) is an American professional disc golfer from Show Low, Arizona. In 2006, he won the PDGA Amateur Disc Golf World Championships and began playing professionally the following season. As of June 2020, Ulibarri has competed in over 500 PDGA sanctioned events and has 107 career tournament wins. His career earnings total over $304,000 making him the 7th highest earner in PDGA history. Ulibarri is currently the Discraft Team Captain and a member of the commentary team for Jomez Productions.

Professional career 
Since 2006, Ulibarri has finished in the top 10 of a Major Tournament 23 times. He finished every season between 2015 and 2021 among the top 15 players in total DGPT Points – excluding 2019 when he withdrew from competition due to injury, and is currently ranked 51st in the PDGA's United States Tour Ranking.   Ulibarri’s 104 tournament wins include 25 A-tier wins and 1 National tour win. Additionally, he won the Mixed Doubles World Championships in 2011 and 2012. As of 2021, Ulibarri holds the record for most consecutive holes played without going out of bounds (137) and has represented Team USA in The Presidents cup 5 times.

Sponsorship and media 
Ulibarri’s first sponsorship was with Discraft in 2006. In 2008, he left Discraft and signed for 3 years with Innova discs until 2011. He joined Prodigy Discs in 2013 as part of their first class of sponsored players and represented prodigy for 6 years before returning to Discraft Discs in 2019, this time as the Team Captain. In 2020 Ulibarri joined Team Ledgestone, a disc golf retailer which handles his merchandising and which also runs the largest event on the Disc Golf Pro Tour, the Ledgestone Open in Peoria, Illinois. His other sponsors include Bushnell Corporation and Züca, a disc golf cart manufacturer. Ulibarri can be seen on Jomez Productions, a YouTube channel specializing in professional disc golf coverage and entertainment, as part of the commentary team and is regularly featured in their content along with Nathan Sexton and Jeremy Koling. 

In 2021, Paul launched the Ulibarri Leadership Institute, an organization promoting the sport of disc golf through coaching, seminars, and mentorship programs. On the launch of the Ulibarri Leadership Institute, Paul Ulibarri said, "I have been blessed to be able to play the sport that I love for so long at a high level, and as I continue my journey as a player, am thrilled to share what I've learned throughout my career and help continue growing the sport. The Ulibarri Leadership Institute will be collaborating with some of the most talented names in sports to deliver unmatched instruction and career development services." 
In March of 2022, Paul Ulibarri launched his charity organization, The Ulibarri Leadership Foundation, which offers scholarships for young disc golfers to attend college.

References 

American disc golfers
1988 births
Living people
People from Arizona